Tony Liu Tian-jue (born 7 February 1952) is a Hong Kong actor and martial artist. He is often credited by his Cantonese stage name Lau Wing. Liu is best known for starring in many Hong Kong martial arts films, especially in the 1970s and 1980s. He has also acted in some television series.

Early life
Liu was born in 1952 in Hong Kong. His mother was Lai Man (aka Li Wen)(1916–1983), who was a well-known actress in Hong Kong. 

Lau studied in St. Paul's College before going on to learn to play the piano at the Associated Board of the Royal Schools of Music (ABRSM). He practised martial arts such as Judo, Kung-Fu, Karate, & also learned Jeet Kune Do from Bruce Lee until Lee's death.

Career

Liu joined the Hong Kong film production company Golden Harvest in 1970 at the age of 18. He made his debut as the son of the villain in the 1971 film The Big Boss, which starred Bruce Lee in his first major role. He appeared in another three of Bruce Lee's films – as a martial arts student in Fist of Fury (1972); as a restaurant worker who practises karate in Way of the Dragon (1972); and as a tournament fighter in Enter the Dragon (1973).

Liu rose to prominence after joining the Shaw Brothers Studio in 1975 and made his first breakthrough role in Emperor Chien Lung (1976) as the Qianlong Emperor, and later in the sequels. He acted in various television series produced by ATV, as well as movies and moved his career to China in the 2000s, before returning to Hong Kong from Zhongshan in 2017, citing the need to take care and raise his younger son.

Lau has been a two time nominee at the Golden Horse Awards, for A Man of Immortality (1981) and Revenge: A Love Story (2010).

Personal life 
Liu's first wife was Tai Liang Chun (戴良純), a former Taiwanese actress whom he married from 1983 to 1984. Liu abused his Tai and also disfigured her face in Taiwan. Liu fled back to Hong Kong to avoid prison in Taiwan. In 1992, Liu married Eva Lai (黎燕珊), a Hong Kong actress and Miss Asia 1985. They have two children, Wynce (born 1994) and Dicky (born 1998). Lai filed for separation at the Hong Kong High Court in 2000 due to domestic violence, and finalized their divorce in 2004 where Lai gained custody of their children. 

In 2007, Liu married Huang Li Yan, a Chinese girl who was 30 years his junior. The couple lived in Shenzhen, China where they had two sons (born 2007 and 2011 respectively). Huang eventually filed for divorce in 2019 due to the generation gap.

Filmography
In film, Liu is credited as Lau Wing.

As actor
 Gui liu xing (1971)
 The Big Boss (1971) - Hsiao Chiun
 Fist of Fury (1972) - Chin
 Way of the Dragon (1972) - Tony
 Back Alley Princess (1973)
 Enter the Dragon (1973) - Tournament Fighter (Guest star) (uncredited)
 The Devil's Treasure (1973)
 Manchu Boxer (1974)
 Dynamite Brothers (1974)
 Naughty! Naughty! (1974)
 Desire (1974)
 Seven Coffins (1975)
 Money Is Everything (1975)
 Bar Girl (1975)
 Black Alice (1975)
 Emperor Chien Lung (1976)
 The Dragon Missile (1976)
 Brotherhood (1976)
 Tiger of Northland (1976)
 Shaolin Temple (1976)
 Adventures of Emperor Chien Lung (1977)
 The Naval Commandos (1977)
 Deadly Angels (1977)
 To Kill a Jaguar (1977)
 Death Promise (1977)
 Pursuit of Vengeance (1977)
 Clan of Amazons (1978)
 The Psychopath (1978)
 Legend of the Bat (1978)
 Swordsman and Enchantress (1978)
 The Voyage of Emperor Chien Lung (1978)
 The Brothers (1979)
 Invincible Enforcer (1979)
 The Convict Killer (1980)
 Emperor Chien Lung and the Beauty (1980)
 The Tiger and the Widow (1981)
 The Duel of the Century (1981)
 Return of the Sentimental Swordsman (1981)
 Notorious Eight (1981)
 Bloody Parrot (1981)
 The Bloody Mission (1982)
 Tiger Killer (1982)
 Passing Flickers (1982)
 Human Lanterns (1982)
 The Spirit of the Sword (1982)
 The Big Sting (1982)
 The Pure and the Evil (1982)
 The Emperor and the Minister (1982)
 The Enchantress (1983)
 Usurpers of Emperor's Power (1983)
 Bastard Swordsman (1983)
Lady Assassin (1983)
 Empress Wu (1984) (TV series)
 Secret Service of the Imperial Court (1984)
 Return of Bastard Swordsman (1984)
 Sex Beyond the Grave (1984)
 Rise of the Great Wall (1986) (TV series)
 Genghis Khan (1987) (TV series)
 Poor Man's Orange (1987) (TV series)
 Bloodshed Over the Forbidden City (1990) (TV series)
 Dragon Killer (1995)
 How to Meet the Lucky Stars (1996)
 Baroness (2000)
 Visible Secret (2001)
 My Ma Has Son Fever (2004)
 The Valiant Ones New (2007)
 Wu Seng (2007)
 Legend of the Fist: Chen Zhen (2008)
 Taishan Kung Fu (2009)
 The Wrath of Vajra (2013)
 Mrs K (2016)
 Little Q (2019)
 Sons of the Neon Night (2019)
 The Lady Improper (2019)

As director
Dragon Killer (1995)
Baroness (2000)

References

External links

Hong Kong Cinemagic: Anthony Lau Wing
Lau Wing at hkmdb.com

1952 births
20th-century Hong Kong male actors
21st-century Hong Kong male actors
Hong Kong male film actors
Living people
Hong Kong male judoka
Hong Kong male karateka
Hong Kong kung fu practitioners
Chinese Jeet Kune Do practitioners
Cantonese people